This list of linear television channels in the United Kingdom refers to television in the United Kingdom which is available from digital terrestrial, satellite, cable, and IPTV providers, with an estimated more than 480 channels.

Multi-channel networks

British Broadcasting Corporation

Channels from the BBC & UKTV, a wholly owned subsidiary of BBC Studios:

 Subject to regional variation.  Programming in Scottish Gaelic.

ITV plc 

Channels from ITV Network Limited (a joint venture between ITV plc & STV Group plc):

 Subject to regional variation

Channel Four Television Corporation

Channels from the Channel Four Television Corporation also including channels from The Box Plus Network, a former joint-venture between Channel Four Television Corporation and Bauer Media Group which is now fully owned by Channel 4 Television Corporation with Kerrang, Kiss and Magic brandings under licence:

 Advertising regions.

Paramount

Channels from Paramount and its subsidiaries/partnerships:

Sky Group 

Channels from Sky.

Warner Bros. Discovery

Channels from Discovery Networks Northern Europe, TBS Europe and BT Sport (A joint venture between WBD and BT):

Narrative Capital
Channels owned by Narrative Capital (Purchased from Sony Pictures Television):

Regional networks 
Channels broadcast to a limited area (most channels are available to stream online from across the UK):

Wales 

 Subject to regional variation.  Programming in Welsh.

Scotland
 Subject to regional variation.  Programming in Scottish Gaelic.

England
 Subject to regional variation.  Programming in Cornish Celtic.

Northern Ireland 
Channels from the Republic of Ireland available in Northern Ireland:

 Subject to regional variation.  Programming in Irish.

Single-channel and specialist networks

General

Music

News

Sport

Kids

Shopping

Adult

International networks

News

General

Religion

See also
 International BBC television channels
 List of television stations in Northern Ireland
 List of former TV channels in the United Kingdom
 Lists of television channels

Notes

References

External links

Lists of British television channels
United Kingdom
Television channels in the United Kingdom